Stan Weir (23 April 1904 – 11 June 2002) was an Australian cricketer. He played in one first-class match for Queensland in 1929/30.

See also
 List of Queensland first-class cricketers

References

External links
 

1904 births
2002 deaths
Australian cricketers
Queensland cricketers
Cricketers from Queensland